The Kardashev scale (Russian: Шкала Кардашева, Shkala Kardasheva) is a method of measuring a civilization's level of technological advancement based on the amount of energy it is able to use. The measure was proposed by Soviet astronomer Nikolai Kardashev in 1964 and came to bear his name.

The scale is hypothetical, and regards energy consumption on a cosmic scale. Various extensions of the scale have since been proposed, including a wider range of power levels (types 0, IV to V) and the use of metrics other than pure power (e.g., computational growth).

Kardashev first outlined his scale in a paper presented at the 1964 Byurakan conference, a scientific meeting that reviewed the Soviet radio astronomy space listening program. This paper, entitled "Передача информации внеземными цивилизациями" (and then translated into English "Transmission of Information by Extraterrestrial Civilizations"), proposes a classification of civilizations into three types, based on the postulate of exponential progression. A type I civilization is able to access all the energy available on its planet and store it for consumption. A type II civilization can directly consume the energy of a star. Finally, a type III civilization is able to capture all the energy emitted by its galaxy. In a second article, entitled "Strategies of Searching for Extraterrestrial Intelligence" and published in 1980, Kardashev wonders about the ability of civilization, which he defines by its capacity to access energy, to maintain itself and to integrate information from its environment. Two other articles followed: "On the Inevitability and the Possible Structure of Supercivilizations" and "Cosmology and Civilizations", published respectively in 1985 and 1997; the Soviet astronomer proposes tracks to detect supercivilizations and to direct the SETI programs.

The scale defined by Kardashev has been the subject of two main re-evaluations: that of Carl Sagan, who refines the types, and that of Michio Kaku, who discards the energy postulate in favor of the knowledge economy. Other debates on the nature of the different types have allowed many authors to question Kardashev's original classification, either to complete it or to refute it. Two critical perspectives have thus emerged: one that questions Kardashev's postulates, judging them to be incomplete or inconsistent, the other that establishes alternative scales. The Kardashev scale has given rise to numerous scenarios exploring the possibility of more evolved civilizations. These scenarios question, each one in its own way, the three postulates of Kardashev defining a civilization: energy sources, technology and the transmission of interstellar messages.

The framework for the search for and detection of advanced civilizations was constructed and theorized during the conference held in 1964 in Armenia, at the Byurakan astrophysical observatory. Starting from a functional definition of civilization, based on the immutability of physical laws and using the human civilization as a model of extrapolation, the initial model of Kardashev was developed. Several scientists have conducted various searches for possible civilizations, but without conclusive results. Based on these criteria, unusual objects, now known to be either pulsars or quasars, were identified.

Categories defined by Kardashev 
The hypothetical classification known as the Kardashev scale distinguishes three stages of evolution of civilizations according to the double criterion of the access and the use of the energy. The purpose of this classification is to guide the search for extraterrestrial civilizations, particularly within SETI, in which Kardashev participated,  and this on the assumption that a fraction of the energy used by each type is intended to communicate with other civilizations. To make this scale more understandable, Lemarchand compares the speed of transmission across the galaxy of a volume of information equivalent to a medium-sized library. A type II civilization can send this data by means of a transmission beam emitting for only 100 seconds. A similar amount of information can be sent across intergalactic distances of about ten million light years, with a transmission time of several weeks. A type III civilization can transmit this same amount of data to the entire observable universe with a transmission time of 3 seconds.

Kardashev's classification is based on the assumption of a growth rate of 1% per year. Kardashev believed that it will take humanity 3,200 years to reach Type II, and 5,800 years to reach Type III. These types are thus separated from each other by a growth rate of several billion.

Type I 
A civilization "close to the level presently attained on Earth, with energy consumption at ≈4 erg/sec" (4 watts). A Type I civilization is usually defined as one that can harness all the energy that reaches its home planet from its parent star (for Earth, this value is around 2 watts), which is about four orders of magnitude higher than the amount presently attained on Earth, with energy consumption at ≈2 watts as of 2020.

Type II 
A civilization capable of harnessing the energy radiated by its own large star—for example, by means of the successful completion of a Dyson sphere or Matrioshka brain—with energy consumption at ≈4 erg/sec. Lemarchand defined civilizations of this type as being capable of using and channeling the entire radiation output of its star. The energy use would then be comparable to the luminosity of the Sun, about 4 erg/sec (4 watts).

Type III 
A civilization in possession of energy at the scale of its own galaxy, with energy consumption at ≈4 erg/sec. Lemarchand defined civilizations of this type as having access to power comparable to the luminosity of the entire Milky Way galaxy, about 4 erg/sec (4 watts).

Kardashev believed that a Type 4 civilization was impossible, so he did not go past Type 3. However, new types (0, IV, V, VI) have been proposed.

Current status of human civilization

At the current time, humanity has not yet reached Type I civilization status. Physicist and futurist Michio Kaku suggested that, if humans increase their energy consumption at an average rate of 3 percent each year, they may attain Type I status in 100–200 years, Type II status in a few thousand years, and Type III status in 100,000 to a million years.

Carl Sagan suggested defining intermediate values (not considered in Kardashev's original scale) by interpolating and extrapolating the values given above for types I ( W), II ( W) and III ( W), which would produce the formula

,

where value K is a civilization's Kardashev rating and P is the power it uses, in watts. Using this extrapolation, a "Type 0" civilization, not defined by Kardashev, would control about 1 MW of power (e.g. the food consumption of about 10,000 persons), and humanity's civilization type as of 1973 was about 0.7 (apparently using 10 terawatt (TW) as the value for 1970s humanity).

In 2021, the total world energy consumption was 595.15 exajoules (165,319 TWh), equivalent to an average power consumption of 18.87 TW or 0.73 (to 2 s.f.) on Sagan's interpolated Kardashev scale.

Observational evidence
In 2015, a study of galactic mid-infrared emissions came to the conclusion that "Kardashev Type-III civilizations are either very rare or do not exist in the local Universe".

In 2016, Paul Gilster, author of the Centauri Dreams website, described a signal apparently from the star HD 164595 as requiring the power of a Type I or Type II civilization, if produced by extraterrestrial lifeforms. However, in August 2016 it was discovered that the signal's origin was most likely a military satellite orbiting the Earth.

Energy development

Type I civilization methods
 Large-scale application of fusion power. According to mass–energy equivalence, Type I implies the conversion of about 2 kg of matter to energy per second. An equivalent energy release could theoretically be achieved by fusing approximately 280 kg of hydrogen into helium per second, a rate roughly equivalent to 8.9 kg/year. A cubic km of water contains about  kg of hydrogen, and the Earth's oceans contain about 1.3 cubic km of water, meaning that humans on Earth could sustain this rate of consumption over geological time-scales, in terms of available hydrogen.
 Antimatter in large quantities would provide a mechanism to produce power on a scale several magnitudes above the current level of technology. In antimatter-matter collisions, the entire rest mass of the particles is converted to radiant energy. Their energy density (energy released per mass) is about four orders of magnitude greater than that from using nuclear fission, and about two orders of magnitude greater than the best possible yield from fusion. The reaction of 1 kg of anti-matter with 1 kg of matter would produce 1.8 J (180 petajoules) of energy. Although antimatter is sometimes proposed as a source of energy, this does not appear feasible. Artificially producing antimatter—according to current understanding of the laws of physics—involves first converting energy into mass, which yields no net energy. Artificially created antimatter is only usable as a medium of energy storage, not as an energy source, unless future technological developments (contrary to the conservation of the baryon number, such as a CP violation in favor of antimatter) allow the conversion of ordinary matter into anti-matter. Theoretically, humans may in the future have the capability to cultivate and harvest a number of naturally occurring sources of antimatter.
 Renewable energy through converting sunlight into electricity—either by using solar cells and concentrating solar power or indirectly through biofuel, wind and hydroelectric power. There is no known way for human civilization to use the equivalent of the Earth's total absorbed solar energy without completely coating the surface with human-made structures, which is not feasible with current technology. However, if a civilization constructed very large space-based solar power satellites, Type I power levels might become achievable—these could convert sunlight to microwave power and beam that to collectors on Earth.

Type II civilization methods

 Type II civilizations might use the same techniques employed by a Type I civilization, but applied to a large number of planets in a large number of planetary systems.
 A Dyson sphere or Dyson swarm and similar constructs are hypothetical megastructures originally described by Freeman Dyson as a system of orbiting solar power satellites meant to enclose a star completely and capture most or all of its energy output.
 Another means to generate usable energy would be to feed a stellar mass into a black hole, and collect photons emitted by the accretion disc. Less exotic means would be simply to capture photons already escaping from the accretion disc, reducing a black hole's angular momentum; this is known as the Penrose process. This, however, may only be possible for a Type III civilization to achieve.
 Star lifting is a process where an advanced civilization could remove a substantial portion of a star's matter in a controlled manner for other uses.
 Antimatter is likely to be produced as an industrial byproduct of a number of megascale engineering processes (such as the aforementioned star lifting) and, therefore, could be recycled. 
 In multiple-star systems of a sufficiently large number of stars, absorbing a small but significant fraction of the output of each individual star.
 Stellar engines can be used to move stars.

Type III civilization methods 
 Type III civilizations might use the same techniques employed by a Type II civilization, but applied to all possible stars of one or more galaxies individually.
 They may also be able to tap into the energy released from the supermassive black holes believed to exist at the center of most galaxies.
 White holes could theoretically provide large amounts of energy from collecting the matter propelling outwards.
 Capturing the energy of gamma-ray bursts is another theoretically possible power source for a highly advanced civilization.
 The emissions from quasars are comparable to small active galaxies and could provide a massive power source if collectible.

Civilization implications
There are many historical examples of human civilization undergoing large-scale transitions, such as the Industrial Revolution. The transition between Kardashev scale levels could potentially represent similarly dramatic periods of social upheaval since they entail surpassing the hard limits of the resources available in a civilization's existing territory. A common speculation suggests that the transition from Type 0 to Type I might carry a strong risk of self-destruction since, in some scenarios, there would no longer be room for further expansion on the civilization's home planet, as in a Malthusian catastrophe. Excessive use of energy without adequate heat disposal, for example, could plausibly make the planet of a civilization approaching Type I unsuitable to the biology of the dominant life-forms and their food sources. If Earth is an example, then sea temperatures in excess of  would jeopardize marine life and make the cooling of mammals to temperatures suitable for their metabolism difficult if not impossible. Of course, these theoretical speculations may not become problems, possibly through the applications of future engineering and technology. Also, by the time a civilization reaches Type I it may have colonized other planets or created O'Neill-type colonies, so that waste heat could be distributed throughout the planetary system.

The limitation of biological life-forms and the evolution of computing technology may lead to the transformation of the civilization through mind uploading and artificial general intelligence in general during the transition from Type I to Type II, leading to a digitalized civilization.

Extensions to the original scale
Many extensions and modifications to the Kardashev scale have been proposed.

 Types 0, IV, and V Kardashev rating: The most straightforward extension of the scale would include Type 0 civilizations, who do not rank on the Kardashev scale, to even more hypothetical Type IV beings who can control or use the entire universe or Type V who control collections of universes. The power output of the visible universe is within a few orders of magnitude of 1045 W. Such a civilization approaches or surpasses the limits of speculation based on current scientific understanding and may not be possible. 
 Zoltán Galántai has argued that such a civilization could not be detected, as its activities would be indistinguishable from the workings of nature (there being nothing to compare them to).
 In his books Hyperspace and Parallel Worlds, Michio Kaku has discussed a Type IV civilization that could harness "extragalactic" energy sources such as dark energy.

Kardashev alternative rating characteristics
Other proposed changes to the scale use different metrics such as 'mastery' of systems, amount of information used, or progress in control of the very small as opposed to the very large:
 Planet mastery (Robert Zubrin): Metrics other than pure power usage have also been proposed. One is 'mastery' of a planet, system or galaxy rather than considering energy alone.
 Information mastery (Carl Sagan): Alternatively, Carl Sagan suggested adding another dimension in addition to pure energy usage: the information available to the civilization.
 He assigned the letter A to represent 106 unique bits of information (less than any recorded human culture) and each successive letter to represent an order of magnitude increase so that a level Z civilization would have 1031 bits.
 In this classification, 1973 Earth is a 0.7 H civilization, with access to 1013 bits of information. In 2018, Earth was a 0.73 J civilization.
 Sagan believed that no civilization has yet reached level Z, conjecturing that so much unique information would exceed that of all the intelligent species in a galactic supercluster and observing that the universe is not old enough to exchange information effectively over larger distances.
 The information and energy axes are not strictly interdependent so that even a level Z civilization would not need to be Kardashev Type III.
 Microdimensional mastery (John Barrow): John D. Barrow observed that humans have found it more cost-effective to extend their abilities to manipulate their environment over increasingly small scales rather than increasingly large ones. He, therefore, proposes a reverse classification downward from Type I-minus to Type Omega-minus:
 Type I-minus is capable of manipulating objects over the scale of themselves: building structures, mining, joining and breaking solids;
 Type II-minus is capable of manipulating genes and altering the development of living things, transplanting or replacing parts of themselves, reading and engineering their genetic code;
 Type III-minus is capable of manipulating molecules and molecular bonds, creating new materials;
 Type IV-minus is capable of manipulating individual atoms, creating nanotechnologies on the atomic scale, and creating complex forms of artificial life;
 Type V-minus is capable of manipulating the atomic nucleus and engineering the nucleons that compose it;
 Type VI-minus is capable of manipulating the most elementary particles of matter (quarks and leptons) to create organized complexity among populations of elementary particles; culminating in:
 Type Omega-minus is capable of manipulating the basic structure of space and time. 
 The human civilization is somewhere between type I-minus and type II-minus according to this classification.
 Civilizational range (Robert Zubrin): Robert Zubrin adapts the Kardashev scale to refer to how widespread a civilization is in space, rather than to its energy use.
 In his definition, a Type I civilization has spread across its planet.
 A Type II has extensive colonies in its respective stellar system.
 A Type III has colonized its galaxy.

See also

 Astronomical engineering
 Clarke's three laws
 Drake equation
 Dyson sphere
 Gerhard Lenski
 Great Filter
 HD 164595
 Orders of magnitude (energy)
 Orders of magnitude (power)
 Tabby's Star (KIC 8462852)
 Terraforming
 White's law
 World energy supply and consumption

References

Further reading

 Dyson, Freeman J. Energy in the Universe Article in September 1971 Scientific American magazine (Special September Issue on Energy)
 Wind Powering America 
 Clean Energy for Planetary Survival: International Development Research Centre
 LBL Scientists Research Global Warming 
 E³ Handbook
 Clarke H2 energy systems
 
 
 Shkadov Thruster 
 
 
 Supercivilizations as Possible Products of the Progressive Evolution of Matter: also by Kardashev
 Search for Artificial Stellar Sources of Infrared Radiation, by Freeman J. Dyson
 The Radio Search For Intelligent Extraterrestral Life, by Frank Drake

External links
 Kardashev civilizations
 Astrobiology: The Living Universe
 Detectability of Extraterrestrial Technological Activities
 Flash Animation on Civilizations
 After Kardashev: Farewell to Super Civilizations
 Exotic Civilizations: Beyond Kardashev
 Description of civilization types from Dr. Michio Kaku
 Search for Type III civilizations
 What Do Alien Civilizations Look Like? The Kardashev Scale, a short YouTube video by Kurzgesagt, explaining and visualizing the topic
 Kardashev Scale, the big picture on space civilizations, an audio podcast by SciFi Thoughts

1964 in Russia
1964 introductions
1964 in science
Energy development
Extraterrestrial life
Fictional technology
Futures studies
Ontology
Scales
Search for extraterrestrial intelligence
Sustainability metrics and indices
Technology timelines
Transhumanism